Richard Lennon Murray (1840 – 13 March 1887) was an Irish-born Australian politician.

He was born in County Tipperary to denominational schoolteacher Henry Murray and his wife Mary Ann. In 1861 he married Catherine McEvoy. He migrated to Australia in 1869, becoming a surveyor. In 1880 he was elected to the New South Wales Legislative Assembly for Inverell, serving until his defeat in 1885. Murray died at Leichhardt in 1887.

References

 

1840 births
1887 deaths
Members of the New South Wales Legislative Assembly
19th-century Australian politicians
Irish emigrants to colonial Australia
People from County Tipperary